The 2020 New Mexico United season was the second season for New Mexico United in the USL Championship (USL-C), the second-tier professional soccer league in the United States and Canada. This article covers the period from November 18, 2019, the day after the 2019 USL-C Playoff Final, to the conclusion of the 2020 USL-C Playoff Final, scheduled for November 12–16, 2020.

On March 12 the season was suspended for a minimum of 30 days due to concerns for player and fans health during the COVID-19 pandemic.

On June 4, the league announced a return to play on July 11, 2020 and on July 2 the club announced its updated schedule.

Season in Review

Off-season and Pre-season
The club completed its inaugural season by leading the league in attendance while qualifying for the last playoff spot in the western conference, although they fell in the play-in round to the Sacramento Republic. Their run to the quarter-finals of the U.S. Open Cup saw them eliminate two established USL-C clubs and two MLS clubs before falling to eventual runners-up Minnesota United. One week after their elimination from the playoffs in October, the club announced that they would be retaining a majority (thirteen) of the players from the inaugural season roster. Fullback Ethen Sampson and midfielders Ken Akamatsu, Tommy Madden, and Toni Soler left the club at the expiration of their contracts after the 2019 season. In November, the club announced that they had signed new contracts with two additional inaugural season players, midfielder Daniel Bruce and defender Manny Padilla. Santi Moar departed the club in December, moving to Four Corners Cup opponent Phoenix Rising FC.

The club announced their first signing of the off-season, Amando Moreno, on December 5, followed by 2019 USL Cup winner Kalen Ryden on December 17. January saw three additions to the squad in goalkeeper Philipp Beigl, forward Sammy Sergi, and defender David Najem. On January 29, New Mexico United drew USL League One opponent Greenville Triumph SC in the Second Round of the U.S. Open Cup, to be played April 7. The club announced the signing of midfielder Andrew Tinari on February 7, the day before a scheduled preseason friendly against Colorado Springs Switchbacks. However, inclement weather in Colorado Springs precluded the team from travelling to Albuquerque, and the match was canceled, replaced by a 60-minute intrasquad scrimmage. On February 12, 2019, top scorer Kevaughn Frater completed a move to Indian Super League club Bengaluru FC on a short-term contract. The next day, French midfielder Joris Ahlinvi became the final preseason addition to the squad, after not signing with FC Cincinnati as 53rd overall pick in the 2020 MLS SuperDraft.

The club played preseason exhibitions against USL Championship opponents El Paso Locomotive, OKC Energy FC, Phoenix Rising FC, and USL League One Phoenix affiliate FC Tucson, all behind closed doors.

Also during February, New Mexico state legislators approved a $4.1 million capital outlay to fund feasibility and design studies for a potential soccer-specific stadium in the city of Albuquerque.

March 
New Mexico United began the 2020 competitive season away at fellow 2019 expansion team Austin Bold FC. New signings Najem, Ryden, Parkes, and Sergi all debuted in the eventual 1–0 loss. Before the next scheduled match against FC Tulsa, on March 12 the season was suspended for 30 days due to the COVID-19 pandemic in the United States. The next day, the U.S. Open Cup announced a temporary suspension of the competition. The club's Second Round entrance against Greenville Triumph was therefore postponed indefinitely. On March 18, the suspension was extended until May 10 to comply with CDC recommendations. As a result, games scheduled against FC Tulsa away on March 14, El Paso Locomotive FC at home on March 21, and Las Vegas Lights FC at home on March 25 were postponed.

April 
All matches in April were postponed due to the suspension of play. Games scheduled against Colorado Springs Switchbacks away on April 4, LA Galaxy II at home on April 11, Sacramento Republic away on April 18, and Real Monarchs at home on April 25 were postponed. On April 30, the USL again extended the suspension, this time without setting a firm return date.

May 
All matches in May were postponed due to the suspension of play. Games scheduled against San Antonio FC away on May 9, Rio Grande Valley FC Toros away on May 16, Orange County SC at home on May 23, Portland Timbers 2 away on May 27, and away at Las Vegas Lights FC on May 30 were postponed.

June 
The first three matches in June were postponed due to the suspension of play, including games scheduled against OKC Energy at home on June 10, Phoenix Rising at home on June 13, and Reno 1868 away on June 20. On June 24, the USL released a revised competition format to play an abbreviated season, aiming to return in July. Teams would be drawn into eight regional groups of four or five teams, with the top two from each group advancing to the 2020 USL playoffs. The following day, the club was placed into Group C with Colorado Springs Switchbacks, El Paso Locomotive, and Real Monarchs.

July 
On July 2, the revised schedule was finalized to include inter-group matches against OKC Energy, Phoenix Rising, and Rio Grande Valley FC Toros. Before the season restarted, on July 9 New Mexico Governor Michelle Lujan Grisham announced that the club would not play games or practice in New Mexico, as part of a wider moratorium on contact sports ordered in response to the coronavirus pandemic. On July 11, New Mexico United resumed play at Colorado Springs Switchbacks in their second competitive match of 2020. Chris Wehan and Saalih Muhammad scored to earn a 2–1 win, the latter of which would win the league's online fan poll goal of the week award. Wehan and Devon Sandoval scored in a 2–2 away draw at El Paso Locomotive on July 15, both scoring again in a 2–1 win in a repeat fixture ten days later. Sandoval won the club's second goal of the week in three for United's second in the latter match on July 24, which would end up being the winner. Cody Mizell won the fan-selected save of the week award in the same game, saving from a headed corner kick.

Two players left the club in July, one temporarily and one permanently. Goalkeeper Ben Beaury left on a season-long loan to Reno 1868 on July 6, leaving Philipp Beigl as second-choice behind Cody Mizell. On July 25, the club released defender Manny Padilla following an investigation into a sexual misconduct case during Padilla's collegiate soccer career.

August 
The club began August with a 3–0 away win over inter-group opponents OKC Energy. Wehan scored in his fourth consecutive game since the resumption of play, along with Amando Moreno and Joris Ahlinvi, the first two new signings to score for the club. On August 8, the club played their second consecutive inter-group match away against Phoenix Rising. Romeo Parkes scored the opening goal in an eventual 5–2 loss, which included a Junior Flemmings hat-trick.

Club

Current roster

Transfers

Transfers Out

Loans Out

Transfers In

Loans In

Competitions

Exhibition

USL Championship

Standings — Group C

Position by round

Match results
On January 9, 2020, the USL announced the 2020 season schedule.

In the preparations for the resumption of league play following the shutdown prompted by the coronavirus pandemic, the remainder of United's schedule was announced on July 2.

USL Cup Playoffs

Four Corners Cup 

On June 24, the league announced the structure of its Return To Play format, separating the league into eight separate groups for regional competitions. Unfortunately, Phoenix was combined with the southern California clubs into Group B, while the other three cup competitors were combined with El Paso into Group C, making a full cup competition impossible for the year.  Matches between Four Corners clubs are identified but no cup will be awarded in 2020.

Statistics 
As of October 18, 2020

Outfield players

Notes

Goalkeepers

References

New Mexico United
New Mexico United
New Mexico
New Mexico United